The Mushroom at the End of the World: On the Possibility of Life in Capitalist Ruins is a 2015 book by the Chinese American anthropologist Anna Lowenhaupt Tsing. The book describes and analyzes the globalized commodity chains of matsutake mushrooms.

Content 
The Mushroom at the End of the World uses the matsutake as a focal point for exploring what Tsing describes as the end of capitalist progress as ecological degradation and economic precarity proliferate in the twenty-first century. The matsutake is considered a delicacy and is a mushroom that thrives in human-disturbed forests, foraged by humans in locales as diverse as Oregon, Yunnan, and Lapland. In the book, Tsing follows foragers as they search for mushrooms, the traders who buy and sell them, and the Japanese consumers who especially prize them, largely as gifts.

Tsing highlights both the resilience of the matsutake, which humans have found cannot be domesticated, and the entanglements between and co-dependency of different species—or multi-species "assemblages"—in not only surviving precarious and disturbed environments, but in creating new environments. On such assemblages, Tsing writes:…one could say that pines, matsutake, and humans all cultivate each other unintentionally. They make each other’s world-making projects possible. This idiom has allowed me to consider how landscapes more generally are products of unintentional design, that is, the overlapping world-making activities of many agents, human and not human. The design is clear in the landscape’s ecosystem. But none of the agents have planned this effect. Humans join others in making land-scapes of unintentional design. As sites for more-than-human dramas, landscapes are radical tools for decentering human hubris. Landscapes are not backdrops for historical action: they are themselves active. Watching landscapes in formation shows humans joining other living beings in shaping worlds.The author draws on these themes not only to critique capitalism, but also to refute the notion of the utility of a single, "unitary critique" of capitalism, arguing instead for the importance of diverse and contingent responses. Tsing writes that "[t]o understand capitalism (and not just its alternatives)… we can’t stay inside the logics of capitalists; we need an ethnographic eye to see the economic diversity through which accumulation is possible."

Awards and recognition
The Mushroom at the End of the World has won numerous awards including the 2016 Victor Turner Prize in Ethnographic Writing from the Society for Humanistic Anthropology and the 2016 Gregory Bateson Book Prize from the Society for Cultural Anthropology. The book was also named a Kirkus Reviews and Times Higher Education best book of 2015.

Reviews

References

Links and related reading
 Princeton University Press website

 
 
 
 
 

2015 non-fiction books
Princeton University Press books
Anthropology books
Agriculture books
Books about food and drink
Books critical of capitalism
Non-fiction books about consumerism